Abbeyknockmoy is a village and parish in County Galway, Ireland. It is known for the nearby ruins of the 12th century Cistercian abbey, established with the Kings of Connacht as its benefactors.  The abbey was the burial site of King Cathal Crobhdearg Ua Conchobair and contains several examples of medieval wall paintings and sculpture. It was formerly part of the kingdom of the Soghain of Connacht.

Abbey
Abbeyknockmoy was originally a Cistercian abbey founded in 1190 by the King of Connacht, Cathal Crobhdearg Ua Conchobair, in fulfilment of a vow made prior to a victory gained by Cathal against the English forces under Almeric de St. Lawrence.  Cathal died a Cistercian monk and was buried there in 1224.  The new abbey was occupied by Cistercian monks from Boyle Abbey.  Substantial parts of the abbey remain, showing close links with other abbeys in the west of Ireland.

The abbey was decorated by medieval wall paintings, traces of which survive in the presbytery: they depict Saint Sebastian, the Crucifixion, the Trinity and the three living and three dead.  One of the surviving fragments also depicts a hunting scene, indicating that hunting was popular in medieval Ireland.  Additionally, the group of sculptors at Abbeyknockmoy can be identified as the same sculptors at work in Boyle Abbey.  There is a capital that includes a fine example of a sculptured head:  according to Roger Stalley, "there is a fine royal head on one of the nave piers.  The nose and chin are smashed, but the carefully defined eyes, elaborate crown and long curly hair are still intact".  He also suggests that the carved head actually represents Ua Conchobair, and "was perhaps a tribute to his benefactions".

The monastery was plundered by William de Burgo in 1200.  In 1483, the abbot was accused of setting fire to the abbey.

Community
Abbeyknockmoy is the home of St Bernards Utd, who won the Western Hygiene Premier Division Title in 2016; the highest League honour in Galway FA Junior soccer.

Abbeyknockmoy was designated as a census town by the Central Statistics Office for the first time in the 2016 census, at which time it had a population of 262 people.

Notable people
 Clifton Wrottesley - Finished in 4th position in the Men's Skeleton at the 2002 Winter Olympics
David Connolly - Retired Irish footballer. Played for Republic of Ireland national football team.
Jim Gaffney - Blyth Spartans striker and Republic of Ireland national football team youth international.

See also
 List of towns and villages in Ireland
 List of abbeys and priories in Ireland (County Galway)

Notes

References

 
 

Towns and villages in County Galway
National Monuments in County Galway